Kouloudiengué is a village and principal settlement (chef-lieu) of the commune of Gomitradougou in the Cercle of Diéma in the Kayes Region of south-western Mali.

The village lies 97 km east of Diéma, Mali just to the north of the Route Nationale 1 (RN1) that links Kayes and the Malian capital Bamako.

References

Populated places in Kayes Region